The siege of Venlo of 1586, also known as the Capture of Venlo, was a Spanish victory that took place on June 28, 1586, at the city of Venlo, in the southeastern of Low Countries, near the German border (present-day Province of Limburg, the Netherlands), between the Spanish forces commanded by Governor-General Don Alexander Farnese, Prince of Parma, and the Dutch garrison of Venlo, supported by relief troops under Maarten Schenck van Nydeggen and Sir Roger Williams, during the Eighty Years' War and the Anglo-Spanish War (1585–1604). After two failed attempts to relieve the city, the siege ended on June 28, 1586, with the capitulation and the withdrawal of the Dutch garrison.

According to John Lothrop Motley, during the siege, there was an important event when the troops of Maarten Schenck and Roger Williams arrived near Venlo to relieve the Dutch garrison. At that night (about 170 Dutch and English soldiers led by Schenck and Williams) they passed through enemy lines with stealth, killed several Spanish soldiers, and even reached the door of the Prince of Parma's tent, where they killed Parma's secretary and his personal guard. Then, with the Spanish camp alerted, Schenck's troops fled to Wachtendonk, being pursued by 2,000 Spanish soldiers. In this pursuit, nearly half of Maarten Schenck's troops were killed or captured.

After the capture of Venlo, in mid-July 1586, the Spanish army led by Don Alexander, surrounded the city of Neuss (or Nuys), an important Protestant stronghold in the Electorate of Cologne, as part of Spanish support to Ernest of Bavaria in the Cologne War. The city refused to capitulate, and consequently Neuss was virtually destroyed by Parma's army. The whole garrison commanded by Hermann Friedrich Cloedt was killed or captured, including himself.

On May 21, 1597, Maurice of Nassau tried to capture Venlo by surprise, but the operation was a failure due to the great defense of the Spanish garrison, supported by the population of the city. In 1606 another attempt led by Frederick Henry resulted in another failure.

See also
 Siege of Grave (1586) 
 Destruction of Neuss
 Siege of Sluis (1587)
 Battle of Zutphen
 List of Governors of the Spanish Netherlands

Notes

References
 Motley, John Lothrop. History of the United Netherlands: from the death of William the Silent to the Synod of Dort. Rotterdam 1872.
 Robert Watson. The History of the Reign of Philip II. King of Spain. A New Edition. Vol III. Printed and fold by J. J. Tourneisen.
 Ennen, Leonard. Geschichte der Stadt Köln. Düsseldorf: Schwann'schen. (1863–1880). 
 Jeremy Black. War in the World: A Comparative History, 1450-1600. First published 2011 by Palgrave MacMillan. 
 David Hume & John Lingard. The History of England: From the Invasion of Julius Caesar to the Revolution in 1688. Vol II. Philadelphia 1859.
 Duffy, Christopher. Siege Warfare: The Fortress in the Early Modern World 1494-1660. First published 1979 by Routledge & Kegan Paul. 
 Anthonis Duyck. Journaal, 1591-1602: Uitg. op last van het departement van Oorlog, met in leiding en aantekeningen door Lodewijk Mulder. Uitgave: Nijhoff, 1864. 
 Parker, Geoffrey. The Army of Flanders and the Spanish Road, 1567–1659. Cambridge: Cambridge University Press, 2004,

External links
 John Lothrop Motley. History of the United Netherlands: from the death of William the Silent to the Synod of Dort. 1586.

Sieges of the Eighty Years' War
Sieges involving Spain
Sieges involving the Dutch Republic
Sieges involving England
Siege of Venlo (1586)
Siege of Venlo (1586)
Battles in Limburg (Netherlands)
Siege of Venlo (1586)